The Bible Christian Church was a Methodist denomination founded by William O’Bryan, a Wesleyan Methodist local preacher, on 18 October 1815 in North Cornwall. The first society, consisting of just 22 members, met at Lake Farm in Shebbear, Devon. Members of the Church were sometimes known as Bryanites, after their founder.

Early history
Primarily concentrated in Cornwall and Devon, the church sent missionaries all over England. By 1820, missions had been established in the Channel Islands and in Kent. They were also strong in the Isle of Wight amongst farm labourers, largely due to the inspirational teachings of Mary Toms of Tintagel, Cornwall. The vicar of Brighstone, Samuel Wilberforce, urged that their influence be countered by having their adherents sacked from their jobs and turned out from their cottages, resulting in their sometimes meeting in a chalk pit. There are several chapels in rural areas of the Island which have the title "Bible Christian Chapel" over the doorway (e.g. Apse Heath, Arreton).

By 1831, ministers were being sent to Prince Edward Island and Ontario, and a mission was established in Canada in 1845. Many of the emigrants from Devon and Cornwall to Canada and the United States in the 1830s were 'Bible Christians', further encouraging the spread of the church in those countries.

Australia was a favourite destination for missionaries by 1850.

Other missionaries worked in New Zealand by 1878, and in China by 1885.

Members of the Bible Christian Church were sometimes known as Bryanites, after their founder. The church made extensive use of female preachers like Ann Freeman, and O'Bryan's wife Catherine.

Later history
While being only a small denomination, the Bible Christians grew faster than the British population throughout their existence.

The Bible Christians recognised the ministry of women, calling them "Female Special Agents". A number of women appear on the stations – the places ministers were appointed to by the Bible Christian Conference. There were fewer than five of these women ministers in 1907, when the separate existence of the Bible Christians came to an end.

In 1907, the Bible Christian Church in England was amalgamated with the United Methodist Free Churches and the Methodist New Connexion, to form the United Methodist Church. In Canada, the Bible Christian Church had already been amalgamated, in 1884, into the Methodist Church of Canada, which later became part of the United Church of Canada. In Australia, it merged into the Methodist Church of Australasia on 1 January 1902.

See also
 Sam Pollard — Bible Christian missionary to China
 Paul Robins — Bible Christian missionary to Canada
 John Hicks Eynon — Bible Christian missionary to Canada
 Billy Bray
 James Way – Bible Christian missionary to Australia
 Serena Lake – Bible Christian missionary to Australia
 Bible Christian Mission
 Penrose Methodist Chapel

References

See also Lloyd (2010) Women and the shaping of British Methodism

Further reading

 Mary Toms
 Bible Christian Magazine 1878

Former Methodist denominations
Christianity in Cornwall
Christianity in Devon
Religious organizations established in 1815
Christian denominations established in the 19th century
1815 establishments in England